This article lists the latest men's squads lists for badminton's 2020 Badminton Asia Team Championships. Ranking stated are based on world ranking date for 4 February 2020 as per tournament's prospectus.

Group A
Group A consists of Indonesia, 
and Korea.

Indonesia

Korea

Group B
Group B consists of India, 
Malaysia, 
and Kazakhstan.

India

Malaysia

Kazakhstan

Group C
Group C consists of Chinese Taipei, 
Singapore, 
and Philippines.

Chinese Taipei

Singapore

Philippines

Group D
Group D consists of Japan, 
and Thailand.

Japan

Thailand

References

2020 Badminton Asia Team Championships